In molecular biology, the ZapA protein family is a group of related proteins that includes the cell division protein ZapA. The structure of ZapA has a core structure consisting of two layers alpha/beta, and has a long C-terminal helix that forms dimeric parallel and tetrameric antiparallel coiled coils. ZapA interacts with FtsZ, where FtsZ is part of a mid-cell cytokinetic structure termed the Z-ring that recruits a hierarchy of fission related proteins early in the bacterial cell cycle. ZapA drives the polymerisation and filament bundling of FtsZ, thereby contributing to the spatio-temporal tuning of the Z-ring.

References

Protein families